The Estadio Hidalgo is a football stadium named after Miguel Hidalgo y Costilla. It is located in Pachuca in the Mexican state of Hidalgo, also named in honor of Miguel Hidalgo.

This sport facility is one of Mexico's mid-sized football stadiums, with a capacity of 30,000. It opened in January 1993, but recently was refurbished and modernized. It is located in the city of Pachuca, formerly a large mining site. This building is used mostly for football games and is the home of C.F. Pachuca.

See also
List of football stadiums in Mexico

References

External links
fussballtempel.net

C.F. Pachuca
Sports venues in Hidalgo (state)
Hidalgo